The Critics' Choice Movie Award for Best Action Movie is one of the awards given to people working in the motion picture industry by the Broadcast Film Critics Association. It was first given out in 2008.

List of winners and nominees

2000s

2010s

2020s

Multiple wins
Christopher Nolan-2

Multiple nominations (2 or more)
Anthony and Joe Russo-4
Christopher Nolan-4
J. J. Abrams-3
Sam Mendes-2
James Mangold-2
Christopher McQuarrie-2
Steven Spielberg-2

References

F
Lists of films by award
Awards for best film
Awards established in 2008